Kalinovsky is a rural locality (a khutor) and the administrative center of Kalinovskoye Rural Settlement, Kikvidzensky District, Volgograd Oblast, Russia. The population was 798 as of 2010. There are 6 streets.

Geography 
Kalinovsky is located on Khopyorsko-Buzulukskaya plain, on the right bank of the Machekha River, 31 km northeast of Preobrazhenskaya (the district's administrative centre) by road. Machekha is the nearest rural locality.

References 

Rural localities in Kikvidzensky District